Baissomantis is an extinct genus of mantises in the family Baissomantidae. There are two described species of Baissomantis both of which are known from the Early Cretaceous Zaza Formation of Buryatia, Russia.

Species
These two species belong to the genus Baissomantis:
 † Baissomantis maculata Gratshev & Zherikhin, 1994
 † Baissomantis picta Gratshev & Zherikhin, 1994

References

†